Gabriel Pelletier (born 1958 in Montreal, Quebec) is a Canadian film and television director. He is best known for his 1996 film Karmina, for which he was a Genie Award nominee for Best Screenplay and Best Director at the 18th Genie Awards in 1997.

His other credits have included the films L'Automne sauvage, Life After Love (La Vie après l'amour), My Aunt Aline, Shadows of the Past, Karmina 2 and Fear of Water (La Peur de l'eau), and episodes of the television series War of the Worlds, Sirens, Emily of New Moon and The Secret Adventures of Jules Verne. He has also directed music videos for Luc de Larochellière, Richard Séguin, Pierre Flynn, Marie-Denise Pelletier, René Simard and Daniel Lavoie.

In 2014, he signed to direct a film adaptation of Robert Girardi's 1997 novel Vaporetto 13.

References

External links

1958 births
Canadian television directors
Canadian screenwriters in French
Canadian music video directors
Film directors from Montreal
Writers from Montreal
Living people